Linda is a genus of longhorn beetles of the subfamily Lamiinae, containing the following species:

subgenus Dasylinda
 Linda apicalis Pic, 1906
 Linda fasciculata Pic, 1902
 Linda javanica (Vuillet, 1912)
 Linda strbai Viktora & Lin, 2014
 Linda testacea (Saunders, 1839)

subgenus Linda
 Linda annamensis Breuning, 1954
 Linda annulicornis Matsushita, 1933
 Linda assamensis Breuning, 1954
 Linda atricornis Pic, 1924
 Linda bimaculicollis Breuning, 1954
 Linda femorata (Chevrolat, 1852)
 Linda fraterna (Chevrolat, 1852)
 Linda gracilicornis Pic, 1907
 Linda javaensis Breuning, 1954
 Linda macilenta Gressitt, 1947
 Linda major Gressitt, 1942
 Linda nigroscutata (Fairmaire, 1902)
 Linda pyritosa Holzschuh, 2013
 Linda rubescens (Hope, 1831)
 Linda semiatra Holzschuh, 2003
 Linda semivittata (Fairmaire, 1887)
 Linda signaticornis Schwarzer, 1925
 Linda stolata Pesarini & Sabbadini, 1997
 Linda subannulicornis Breuning, 1956
 Linda zayuensis Pu, 1981

References

 
Saperdini